British Rail's Class 370 tilting trains, also referred to as APT-P (meaning Advanced Passenger Train Prototype), were the pre-production Advanced Passenger Train units. Unlike the earlier experimental gas-turbine APT-E unit, these units were powered by 25 kV AC overhead electrification and were used on the West Coast Main Line between London Euston and Glasgow Central.

History
The APT-P was unveiled to the public on 7 June 1978 and continued to be used for testing into 1986. Due to ongoing technical problems with these pre-production units, and a lack of cash or political will to take the project forward, the planned APT-S (Advanced Passenger Train Squadron Service) production-series units were never built, but did influence the design of the later InterCity 225 sets designed for the East Coast Main Line electrification. The influence is strongest with the Class 91 locos which took many features from the APT power cars.  The technology was later sold to Fiat Ferroviaria and used for improving their second generation Pendolino trains which are used worldwide, including on the West Coast Main Line as the Class 390.

Numbering
Units were numbered 370001-370006 (plus two spare cars labelled 370007) and were formed as follows:
48101-48107 - Driving Trailer Second
48201-48206 - Trailer Second
48401-48406 - Trailer Restaurant Second Buffet
48301-48306 - Trailer Unclassified
48501-48506 - Trailer First
48601-48607 - Trailer Brake First
49001-49006 - Non-Driving Motor

A full train was made up of two units running back-to-back, with the two motor cars adjoining. The motor cars had no seating accommodation or through-gangway, so the two halves of the train were unconnected for passengers.

Withdrawal and preservation
All six units were withdrawn during 1985–1986, and most cars were quickly scrapped. The remaining cars are exhibited at Crewe Heritage Centre, a museum located next to Crewe station.
 Of these, six cars are formed into a single train: 
48103 - Driving Trailer Second
48404 - Trailer Restaurant Second Buffet
48603 - Trailer Brake First
49002 - Non-Driving Motor
48602 - Trailer Brake First
48106 - Driving Trailer Second
 A single Non-Driving Motor car does not form part of the train and is exhibited separately:
49006 - Non-Driving Motor (not part of the above train) was on loan to the Electric Railway Museum in Coventry from July 2011 until its closure in October 2017 and moved back to Crewe Heritage Centre in March 2018.

Models 
In 1980, Hornby Railways produced a OO gauge five-car set model available as a train set with plain yellow fronts, which was released as a five-car train pack with black fronts and window surrounds in 1981, until appearing in the 1983 catalogue when the train set was last produced. In 1984 it was discontinued from the Hornby range. However, it was featured in the 1985 catalogue, although no new models were produced that year.

In 2020, Hornby Railways announced that as part of their centenary year range - and both the 40th anniversaries of the year it entered service and the original Hornby model a newly tooled OO gauge model of the BR Class 370 Advanced Passenger Train would be launched.
The APT-P will be available as part of a five-car train pack consisting of sets 370 003 and 370 004 with plain yellow fronts included are DTS, TFB, NDM (motorised), TFB and DTS and a seven-car train pack included is the APT U Development coach, consisting of sets 370 001 and 370 002 with DTS, TBF, NDM (motorised), NDM (dummy), TBF and DTS in APT livery with black front and window surrounds with the additional SKU' coaches available separately in four sets of two including TS, TU, TRBS, and TF with the additional NDM (motorised) and the APT U Development coach,(for the five-car pack) for each set to form a realistic complete full rake train for both train packs.

See also 
British Rail Class 91
List of high speed trains

References

Sources

Literature
APT-P: The Intercity Development Train Publisher: British Railways
The Shape of Travel to Come Publisher: British Railways
British Rail's Advanced Passenger Train  Publisher: British Railways
APT Course Notes Publisher: British Railways Scottish Region

Further reading

External links 

 Wickens, A., (1988) APT - With Hindsight Newsletter of the Friends of the National Railway Museum, No.84, Summer 1988
 The Manufacturer (24, February 2004) The great train robbery

High-speed trains of the United Kingdom
370
370
Experimental and prototype high-speed trains
Electric multiple units with locomotive-like power cars
Abandoned trains of the United Kingdom
Train-related introductions in 1980